The family Ctenuchidae contains about 3000 known species, most of which are tropical. Two species may have reached Great Britain unaided, but others are accidental imports with food produce:

Subfamily Syntominae 
 Syntomis phegea, nine-spotted — probably rare immigrant
 Dysauxes ancilla, handmaid — possible rare immigrant from Central & Eastern Europe (one old record)

Subfamily Euchromiinae 
 [Euchromia lethe, basker — imported with West Indian bananas]
 [Antichloris viridis — imported with West Indian bananas]
 [Antichloris caca, docker — imported from South America]
 [Antichloris eriphia, banana stowaway — imported from South America]

See also
List of moths of Great Britain (overview)
Family lists: Hepialidae, Cossidae, Zygaenidae, Limacodidae, Sesiidae, Lasiocampidae, Saturniidae, Endromidae, Drepanidae, Thyatiridae, Geometridae, Sphingidae, Notodontidae, Thaumetopoeidae, Lymantriidae, Arctiidae, Ctenuchidae, Nolidae, Noctuidae and Micromoths

References 
 Waring, Paul, Martin Townsend and Richard Lewington (2003) Field Guide to the Moths of Great Britain and Ireland. British Wildlife Publishing, Hook, UK. .

Moths
Britain